Lists of Coptic church buildings cover church buildings that employ the Alexandrian Rite. They are organized by region or country.

Asia

Israel/Palestine
St Antony Monastery, Jerusalem
Church of the Holy Sepulcher, Jerusalem
St. Mary Coptic Orthodox Convent and Church, Bethlehem, West Bank
Coptic Church of the Annunciation, Nazareth, Israel

Mediterranean and the Levant
Amman Coptic Orthodox Church, Amman, Jordan
St Mark's Coptic Orthodox Church, Nicosia, Cyprus

Gulf States
St Mary & Archangel Mikhail Coptic Orthodox Church, Al Jazirah Al Hamra, United Arab Emirates
Abu Sefeen Coptic Orthodox Church, Sharjah, United Arab Emirates
St Mark and Anba Bishoy's Coptic Orthodox Church, Dubai, United Arab Emirates
St Mina's Coptic Orthodox Church, Jebel Ali, United Arab Emirates
St Antony's Coptic Orthodox Church, Abu Dhabi, United Arab Emirates
St Mary and St Shenoudah's Coptic Orthodox Church, Al Ain, United Arab Emirates
St Peter & St Paul's Coptic Orthodox Church, Doha, Qatar
St Mark Coptic Orthodox Church, Kuwait City, Kuwait

Pakistan
St Mark's Coptic Orthodox Church, Rawalpindi, Pakistan

East Asia
St Mark and St George's Coptic Orthodox Church, Bangkok, Thailand
St Mary and St Mark's Coptic Orthodox Church, Malacca, Malaysia
St Mark's Coptic Orthodox Church, Singapore, Singapore
St Mary & Archangel Michael Coptic Orthodox Church, Guangzhou, China
St Thomas's Coptic Orthodox Church, Hong Kong
St Mary's Coptic Orthodox Church, Seoul, South Korea
St George's Coptic Orthodox Church, Kurayoshi, Tottori, Japan

Egypt
See List of Coptic Orthodox churches in Egypt

Other African Countries

Sudan
Holy Mary Coptic Orthodox Cathedral, Khartoum, Sudan
Saint Mary and Saint Shenouda, Khartoum, Sudan

Ethiopia
St Luke's Coptic Orthodox Church, Gombe, Ethiopia

Kenya
St Pishoy's Coptic Orthodox Church, Bondo, Kenya
St Takla's Coptic Orthodox Church, Ng-lya, Kenya
St Mina Monastery, Maseno, Kenya
St Mark's Coptic Orthodox Church, Kisumu, Kenya
St Anthony's Coptic Orthodox Church, Lela, Kenya
St Mark's Coptic Orthodox Church, Nairobi, Kenya
St Mary's Coptic Orthodox Church, Tala, Kenya
St Mark's Coptic Orthodox Church, Kinyui, Kenya

Tanzania
St Mary's Coptic Orthodox Church, Musoma, Tanzania
St Mina's Coptic Orthodox Church, Tarime, Tanzania

Democratic Republic of the Congo
St Mark's Coptic Orthodox Church, Lubumbashi, Democratic Republic of the Congo

West Africa
St Marc's Coptic Orthodox Church, Abidjan, Ivory Coast
Accra Coptic Orthodox Church, Accra, Ghana
Lome Coptic Orthodox Church, Lomé, Togo
St Mark's Coptic Orthodox Church, Lagos, Nigeria
St Mary's Coptic Orthodox Church, Calabar, Nigeria

Southern Africa
St Mark's Coptic Orthodox Church, Lusaka, Zambia
St Mark's Coptic Orthodox Church, Harare, Zimbabwe
St Mark's Coptic Orthodox Church, Ondangwa, Namibia
The Virgin Mary and St Mark's Coptic Orthodox Church, Johannesburg, South Africa

United Kingdom

England
St Mark's Coptic Orthodox Church, in London
St Mary & St George's Coptic Orthodox Church, Plymouth, Devon
St Peter & St Paul's Coptic Orthodox Church, Bournemouth
St Samuel the Confessor Coptic Orthodox Church, Dorset
St Mary and St Abram Coptic Orthodox Church, Brighton
St Michael and St Bishoy Coptic Orthodox Church, Margate, Kent
St Augustine's Coptic Orthodox Church, Guildford
St Mary and St Shenouda Coptic Orthodox Church, Coulsdon
St John the Evangelist Coptic Orthodox Church, Kent
St Mary and Pope Kirolos Coptic Orthodox Church, Hounslow
St Mary & Archangel Michael Coptic Orthodox Church, Golders Green
St George's Coptic Orthodox Church, Stevenage
St Mary & St Mark Coptic Orthodox Church, Lapworth
St Mary and Archangel Michael Coptic Orthodox Church, Solihull
St Mary and St Antony Coptic Orthodox Church, Solihull
St Anthanasius's Coptic Orthodox Church, Easton
St Mary and Saint George Coptic Orthodox Church, Nottingham
St Mary & St Mina Coptic Orthodox Church, Stockport
St Antony's Coptic Orthodox Church, Rotherham
St Mary and St Abanoub Coptic Orthodox Church, Otley
St Athanasius Monastery, Scarborough
St George and St Athanasius Coptic Orthodox Cathedral, Newcastle upon Tyne

Wales
St Mary and St Mercurius Coptic Orthodox Church, Newport
St Mary and St Abaskhyron Coptic Orthodox Church, Llandudno

Scotland
St Mark's Coptic Orthodox Church, Fife

Northern Ireland
St Steven's Coptic Orthodox Church, Belfast

France
Ermitage St Mark, Le Revest-les-Eaux
St Marc & St George's Coptic Orthodox Church, Marseille
Ste Marie & St Mina's Coptic Orthodox Church, Marseille
Ste Marie & St Marcorios & St Antoine's Coptic Orthodox Church, Rillieux-la-Pape
Monastere de la St Vierge Marie et de l’Archange Michel, Ronchères
Ste Marie & St Marc, Châtenay-Malabry
Archange Michel Et St Georges, Villejuif
Ste Marie Des Coptes, Paris
Ste Marie & St Jean L’Evangeliste, Drancy
Paroisse St Moïse Le Noir Et St Samuel Le Confesseur, Deuil-la-Barre
St Mina & St Mercurios, Colombes
St Maurice & St Verena, Asnières-sur-Seine

North America

United States
See List of Coptic Orthodox Churches in the United States

Canada
See List of Coptic Orthodox Churches in Canada

Mexico
St. Mary and St. Mark's Coptic Orthodox Church, Tlayacapan

Australia
See List of Coptic Orthodox churches in Australia

South America
St Mary and St Mark's Coptic Orthodox Church, Santa Cruz, Bolivia
Virgin Mary & St Paul's Coptic Orthodox Church, Ciudad del Este, Paraguay
São Marcos's Coptic Orthodox Church, Jabaquara, Brazil